One Piece: Pirate Warriors also known in Japan as , is a series of action-adventure video games developed by Omega Force (Koei Tecmo)  and published by Bandai Namco Entertainment. It is based on the One Piece manga and anime franchise by Eiichiro Oda. It is the most successful One Piece video game series, with over 7 million copies sold.

Gameplay 

Pirate Warriors is a series incorporating elements from both the Dynasty Warriors video game series and the One Piece series.

Games 

One Piece: Pirate Warriors

One Piece: Pirate Warriors is the first installment in the One Piece: Pirate Warriors series, released for PlayStation 3. It was released on March 1, 2012, in Japan, September 21, 2012, in Europe, and September 25, 2012, in North America. The game was developed in commemoration of the 15th anniversary of the One Piece manga and anime franchise by Eiichiro Oda. Pirate Warriors was also the first game in the One Piece video game franchise that was released on a PlayStation system since One Piece: Grand Adventure in 2006.

One Piece: Pirate Warriors 2

One Piece: Pirate Warriors 2 is the second installment in the One Piece: Pirate Warriors series, released for PlayStation 3 and PlayStation Vita. It was released in Japan on March 20, 2013, Europe on August 30, 2013, and in the United States on September 3, 2013.

One Piece: Pirate Warriors 3

One Piece: Pirate Warriors 3 is the third installment in the One Piece: Pirate Warriors series, released for PlayStation 3, PlayStation 4, PlayStation Vita, and Microsoft Windows. It was released in Japan on March 26, 2015 and subsequently in Western territories on August 25, 2015. This is the last One Piece video game released for PlayStation 3. An enhanced port for the Nintendo Switch was released in December 2017.

One Piece: Pirate Warriors 4

One Piece: Pirate Warriors 4 is the fourth installment in the One Piece: Pirate Warriors series, released for Microsoft Windows, PlayStation 4, Xbox One, and Nintendo Switch. It was released on March 27, 2020.

Production and release

Playable characters

Reception

Commercial reception

See also 
 List of One Piece video games

Notes

References

External links 

 
Pirate Warriors
Bandai Namco games
Video games developed in Japan
Warriors (video game series)
Koei Tecmo franchises
Video game franchises introduced in 2012